Pachydactylus haackei, also known commonly as Haacke's gecko or Haacke's thick-toed gecko, is a species of lizard in the family Gekkonidae. The species is endemic to Southern Africa.

Etymology
The specific name, haackei, and the common names are in honor of herpetologist Wulf Dietrich Haacke (born 1936) of the Transvaal Museum.

Geographic range
P. haackei is found in southern Namibia and South Africa.

Description
The body is stout, and the ear opening tends to be squarish.

Reproduction
P. haackei is oviparous.

References

Further reading
Branch, William R.; Bauer, Aaron M.; Good, David A. (1996). "A review of the Namaqua gecko, Pachydactylus namaquensis (Reptilia: Gekkonidae) from southern Africa, with the Description of two new species". South African J. Zool. 31 (2): 53-69. (Pachydactylus haackei, new species, p. 61).

Pachydactylus
Reptiles of Namibia
Reptiles of South Africa
Reptiles described in 1996
Taxa named by William Roy Branch